ROMARM is a Romanian state owned defense company and Romania's main supplier for defense technique and services. The company owns 15 factories and a research institute.

Subsidiaries

Arsenal Reșița
Arsenal Resita was founded in 1972 in order to produce medium and large cannons. Due to the decrease in sales the company started offering civilian services as well in 1990 . The company became part of ROMARM in 2001. The factory produces today various types of artillery and anti-air cannons.

Carfil
Carfil was founded in 1922 as "Machinery and Foundry Factory Dumitru Voina" . It changed its name to 1969 and became part of ROMARM in 2001. In 2005 it started producing weapons and ammunition compatible with NATO standards .

Electromecanica
Initially founded in 1955 as an ammunition repair and anti-aircraft artillery factory, Electromecanica has changed its name multiple times since then. The company currently produces a variety of missiles .

Fagaras Powders Plant
Founded in 1939 and renamed "Făgăraș Special Products Plant" in 2006, Făgăraș Powders Plant specializes in producing high-power explosives.

Cugir Arms Factory

One of the oldest defense companies of Romania, Cugir Arms Factory has a history that can be traced back to 1799 when steel manufacturing workshops were founded in Cugir. Having gone through multiple upgrades throughout its existence, Cugir Arms Factory now produces products compatible with NATO standards.

Metrom
Metrom was founded in 1948 as a merger of two companies : FAROLA and METROM SAR . The new official name of the company was METROM Factory Brașov .

Moreni Mechanical Plant
Initially named IAM, the company was founded in 1968 . The factory is today the only defense company of Romania that produces armoured personnel carriers.

Pirochim Victoria
The factory's life began before World War II due to the Romanian state's need of an armament factory. While it was extended at one point to produce a higher range of products, Pirochim Victoria now produces specialty products and is under the authority of Romania's  Ministry of Economy and Commerce.

Plopeni Mechanical Plant
The plant's history begins in 1937 when the construction for a plant to manufacture ammunition and war artillery started. In 1941 the plant became operational under the name Mărgineanca Plant . The plant produces different types of ammunition today.

Tohan
Tohan was founded in 1938 as part of the  MALAXA industrial group. Between 1948 and 1990 it was called 6 March Factory Zărnești and from 1990 to 1998 it changed its name again to Mechanical Plant Tohan Zărnești. Today, the TOHAN Factory specializes in producing artillery munition and missiles.

Mija Mechanical Plant

Sadu Mechanical Plant
Produces Small Arms Ammunition

Bucharest Mechanical Factory
Produces tanks and other heavy mechanical vehicles.

Cugir Mechanical Plant
[This] company acquires modern technologies for brass case and non-corrosive ammunition (NATO specific), that opens a wide perspective concerning subsequent assimilation of other types of ammunition.
It is located in Cugir, Romania.

UPS Dragomiresti

References

External links

Military vehicle manufacturers
Defence companies of Romania
Companies based in Bucharest